Madison Lake is an unincorporated community in Union Township, Madison County, Ohio, United States.

References 

Unincorporated communities in Madison County, Ohio